Batang Ai National Park is a national park located in Sri Aman Division, Sarawak, Malaysia. It is located in Lubok Antu, some 250 kilometers east of Kuching. The park was proclaimed in 1991, and has become increasingly popular with locals and tourists despite the lack of facilities.

Access is possible by chartering a boat (traditional boat called Longboat), as water is the main method of transportation in the area. The ride takes approximately about 40 minutes to Batang Ai National Park headquarters. The lush dipterocarp forests are home to the orang-utan, gibbons, and hornbills. The lake creates a beautiful environment and gives a sense of peace and tranquillity. The local inhabitants are mostly Iban, and tours to nearby Iban longhouses are also a tourist diversion. This national park takes strong steps in having the local communities involved in its management. The communities have formed a cooperative called 'Kooperasi Serbaguna Ulu Batang Ai' and are helping to conserve the park.

See also
Heart of Borneo

External links
 Sarawak Forestry | Batang Ai National Park
 Sarawak Forestry
 Hilton Batang Ai Longhouse Resort
 Aiman Batang Ai Resort and Retreat

National parks of Sarawak
Protected areas established in 1991
1991 establishments in Malaysia
Borneo lowland rain forests